Illovo is a suburb of Sandton, South Africa. It borders Hyde Park, Sandhurst, Inanda and Melrose. Illovo is sought-after and home to many young professionals and creatives because of its close proximity to Sandton and Johannesburg business centres and many affordable apartment blocks. It is located in Region E of the City of Johannesburg Metropolitan Municipality.

History
Illovo's name is derived from the Illovo River in KwaZulu-Natal, which in turn takes its name from the Mlovo (or Mlovu) trees growing on its banks.  Possibly also the isiZulu word 'Indlovu', meaning elephant.

Sports
Wanderers Stadium is located in Illovo, which is home to the Highveld Lions, Johannesburg's cricket team. Capacity at the Imperial Wanderers Stadium is around 27 000.
Construction on the current stadium commenced in 1955 with the first 1st-class match played between Transvaal and Natal on 16, 17 and 19 November 1956.

Education
The University of Pretoria's business school, the Gordon Institute of Business Science (GIBS), is located in Illovo. It has previously been ranked as the best business school in Africa.

References

Johannesburg Region E
University of Pretoria campus